Capital punishment in Uruguay was abolished from its legal system in 1907 by Law N° 3238 passed during the government of president Claudio Williman and later removed from the constitutional system in 1918. It was established by Uruguayan Constitution of 1830.

History

Colonial period 
Capital punishment was applied since the time of Spanish colonization in the current territory of Uruguay. The usual method of execution was by hanging and by firing squad in case of military or political crimes.

Shortly after beginning his term as governor of Montevideo, Agustín de la Rosa in 1764 had the initiative to raise a gallows in the nowadays known as "Constitution" square to "strengthen the peacefulness of the population and to frighten restless people". Occasionally, in particular when it was dealing with white people, death penalty was performed with the device known as "garrote".

Constitution of 1830 
In the first constitution of the recently born Uruguayan state, death penalty is implicitly mentioned in its articles 26 and 84, that regulates the powers of the Chamber of Representatives and the presidential pardon.

Abolition 
Death penalty was abolished by Law N° 3238 of 23 September 1907, during the government of Claudio Williman, which in its Article 1° provides:

This law was unconstitutional at the time of its promulgation, since the Constitution of 1830, then in force, made explicit references to the death penalty in its articles 26 and 84 (see above). But it is also worth to note that this Constitution did not provide any system to allow nullifying laws that opposed to its terms, as it exists today in current Constitution.

The last execution was performed in Maldonado Department on 29 September 1902.

This law was passed after hard debates between abolitionists and anti-abolitionists, which were particularly arduous regarding the suppression of the death penalty for military crimes.

In 1918, the abolition became constitutional by being included in the new Magna Carta that came into force that year, in which is stated:

All subsequent constitutions have upheld that prohibition. It can be found in current Constitution (1967) in article 26.

References 

Uruguay
Politics of Uruguay
Human rights abuses in Uruguay